Nursery School Time is a Canadian children's television series which aired on CBC Television from 1958 to 1963.

Premise
This series featured entertaining and educational topics for pre-school children. It was produced by the CBC's School Broadcast Department which made program plans and recommended reading lists available to parents.

Production of the first run from January to April 1958 was shared between Toronto and Winnipeg, hosted by Teddy Forman and Shirley Knight respectively. Hoppy, a rabbit puppet, was featured on the Toronto episodes. After receiving positive feedback from this initial run, Nursery School Time was renewed for a full season that September. The Toronto segments with Forman and Hoppy were retained with the addition of Smokey, an actual cat. Production from Winnipeg was discontinued in favour of segments from Montreal hosted by Madame Fon Fon (Claudine Vallerand, from Radio-Canada), Mr. Dick (a beaver puppet) and Miki (an actual dog).

Madame Fon Fon was replaced by Madeleine Arbour for the Montreal episodes in 1958. In Toronto, Forman was replaced by Toby Tarnow for the 1961–1962 season.

Scheduling
This 15-minute series was broadcast as follows:

References

External links
 Nursery School Time at CBC Digital Archives
 
 

CBC Television original programming
1950s Canadian children's television series
1958 Canadian television series debuts
1963 Canadian television series endings
Canadian preschool education television series
Canadian television shows featuring puppetry
Black-and-white Canadian television shows